Brigada Antiteroristă (the Counter-terrorism Brigade, BAT) is a tactical special operations unit of the Romanian Intelligence Service (Serviciul Român de Informaţii).

History
The unit was established on December 15, 1977 under the name of Unitatea Specială de Luptă Antiteroristă (Special Counter-terrorism Unit, USLA) as a result of the emergence of terrorist threats that were directly or indirectly aimed at Romania.

USLA confronted attempts by members or sympathizers of different terrorist organizations to enter Romania. These organizations did not limit themselves to precursory acts of preparing violent actions, but they also tried to organize terrorist attacks, the targets generally being foreign official representatives in Bucharest.

On May 26, 1985, two Arab terrorists placed explosive devices under the cars belonging to Syrian students' leaders, in the Grozăveşti Campus parking lot in Bucharest. Two USLA officers were killed by the blast of the device while trying to defuse it.

USLA units were involved in the violent crackdown of anti-communist demonstrations during the Romanian Revolution of 1989

On December 24, 1989, the USLA was called upon by the new Defence Minister Nicolae Militaru to protect the site of the Ministry of Defence from alleged terrorist attacks. The tanks guarding the site opened fire and killed eight officers, while the other six survivors were arrested and one fled. This deadly hoax was used by the new authorities to claim that the terrorist threat really existed.

On the December 26, 1989, the USLA was attached to the Romanian Ministry of Defence. On July 1, 1990, the name of the unit was changed to Brigada Antiteroristă and incorporated into the newly created Romanian Intelligence Service (SRI).

On August 20, 1991, four Sikh terrorists attempted to assassinate the Indian ambassador while he walked with his wife on the Aviatorilor Blvd. in Bucharest. The quick intervention of anti-terrorist officers guarding the ambassador resulted in failure for the terrorists: one was killed on the spot, another was captured, the third was injured and the fourth person vanished. The criminal investigation revealed that the four terrorists belonged to an Indian Sikh terrorist group.

Current activities
At present, there is an increased flow of information shared with partner-foreign services tasked with fighting terrorism. Backed up by state-of-the-art equipment and counter-terrorism tactics, the unit is always on the alert.

Following the September 11, 2001 attacks in the United States, the Inspectorate for Preventing and Fighting Terrorism was confronted with new challenges. To tackle the new terrorist threats, specialized units of the Romanian Intelligence Service implemented special plans designed for such circumstances.

References

External links
  History of the Counter-terrorist Brigade on the SRI website
  Unofficial site
  Information on Romania's counter-terrorism [ dead link ]
  Qualifications required to be a member of USLA [ dead link ]

Romanian Intelligence Service
Special forces of Romania
Terrorism in Romania
Romanian Revolution
1977 establishments in Romania